Ilavarasi is an Indian actress. She has appeared in Tamil, Telugu, Malayalam Kannada and Hindi cinema. She was one of the prominent lead actresses from 1982 to 1992. 
Her popular lead roles are vatsalyam along with Mammootty and Visu' s Samsaram Adhu Minsaram. She is credited as Ilavarasi in Tamil, Kalpana in Telugu and Manjula Sharma in Kannada.She is best known for her supporting roles in late 1990s.

Partial filmography

TV
 Antharangaalu - Telugu serial
 Saradha - Malayalam serial

Awards
Nandi Film Awards 
  Nandi Award for Best Supporting Actress for Sagatu Manishi (1988)

References

External links
 

Indian film actresses
Actresses in Telugu cinema
Living people
Actresses in Malayalam cinema
Actresses in Kannada cinema
Actresses in Tamil cinema
20th-century Indian actresses
21st-century Indian actresses
Actresses in Telugu television
Actresses in Malayalam television
1965 births